Gruia Novac (24 January 1944 – 1999) was a Romanian water polo player. He competed at the 1964 Summer Olympics and the 1972 Summer Olympics.

References

External links
 

1944 births
1999 deaths
Romanian male water polo players
Olympic water polo players of Romania
Water polo players at the 1964 Summer Olympics
Water polo players at the 1972 Summer Olympics
Water polo players from Bucharest